Knife or Death (officially Forged in Fire: Knife or Death) is an American competition series that airs on the History channel. It is a spin-off from the successful Forged in Fire television series.

The show is hosted by former NFL player and WCW/WWE professional wrestler Bill Goldberg, along with co-host Tu Lam, a former US Army Special Forces Soldier, martial artist and edged weapons expert. Two-time Forged in Fire champion Travis Wuertz assists as the show's blade inspection specialist.

On each episode, eight contestants compete through two rounds, using edged weapons that they have either forged themselves or had fabricated to their specifications. They must submit their weapons to a preliminary examination by Wuertz and can be immediately disqualified in case of a safety issue or failure. The contestant who finishes the second-round course in the shorter time advances to the season finale, with a $20,000 cash prize at stake.

Knife or Death premiered April 17, 2018 on History and is produced by Outpost Entertainment.

Format
The contestants in each episode run two obstacle courses individually. A 25-second penalty is added to a contestant's time for each failure to complete an obstacle properly, and a catastrophic weapon failure (defined as damage that renders a weapon unsafe or ineffective for further use) results in disqualification.

Round One: Knife Fight
The first round, "Knife Fight," is a course that tests the quality of the contestants' weapons and their ability to strike stationary targets. The two who either finish the course or move the farthest along it in the shortest time advance to the second round. The course consists of five obstacles:

 Trailblazer: Cut through six 1" wooden dowels or hemp ropes, each of which releases a torch to swing down into a bucket.
 Stick and Move: Three containers (including a wooden crate and a plastic bucket) hang from chains with counterweights suspended on the other end. Each container must be pierced/damaged so that enough of the contents spill out to let its counterweight hit the floor.
 Ice Pick: Strike a 3-foot-tall block of ice and pierce a tube of liquid running up through its center.
 Lifeline: Slash cleanly through three hanging targets: a chicken, a fish, and a plastic tube filled with sand. The contestant is given one attempt per target; a failure on any of them stops the clock and ends the contestant's run immediately.
 Curtain Call: Cut through two hanging targets: a slab of pork belly and a piece of sheet metal. The contestant must then drive the blade into a wooden stump to stop the clock.

Round Two: Dead Run
The second round, "Dead Run," is a course intended to test the two remaining contestants' speed, timing, accuracy, and precision in wielding their blades against both stationary and moving targets. The contestant who finishes the course in the shorter time advances to the season finale. This course consists of six obstacles:

 Steak Knife: Cut five steaks in half as they hang from a rotating carousel.
 Extinguisher: Four lit candles are set beneath funnels. For each, the contestant must cut a rope to release a bottle of water, then slice the bottle on the downswing so that enough water lands in the funnel to run down and put out the candle.
 Weight Cut: Cut 40 pounds each from a hanging ice block and rack of meat slabs.
 Free Fall: One at a time, cut 10 watermelons in half as they are released from overhead chutes. Each cut must expose the melon's red flesh in order to count.
 Strike Zone: Cut a rope to release a curtain, then cut all the targets behind it (ropes, water bottles, slabs of meat, etc.) in half. 
 Firestorm: Cut two ropes, releasing a flight of steps to fall into place, then run up the steps to a platform and chop through a stack of sugar cane.

Season finale changes
In the season finale, the five episode winners and the runner-up with the fastest time in Dead Run compete for the $20,000 prize. All targets are thicker and/or made of tougher materials, with the following specific changes:

 Ice Pick: The ice block has two embedded tubes of liquid that must both be pierced.
 Lifeline: No longer a sudden-death obstacle. The contestant may make multiple attempts, but incurs a time penalty for every attempt after the first on a target.
 Curtain Call: The contestant must cut through three targets (pork loin, plywood, sheet metal).
 Steak Knife: Renamed Rotisserie, with chickens replacing the steaks.
 Weight Cut: The rack of meat slabs is replaced by a second ice block, and the contestant must cut at least 80 pounds from each block before advancing.

Seasons

Episodes
All times include penalties assessed for failing to complete an obstacle properly.

Season 1 (2018)

Season 2 (2018)

Season 3 (2019)

References

External links

2010s American reality television series
2018 American television series debuts
English-language television shows
History (American TV channel) original programming
Television shows about weaponry
2019 American television series endings
American television spin-offs
Reality television spin-offs